May Elias Ziadeh (11 February 1886 – 17 October 1941) was a Lebanese-Palestinian poet, essayist, and translator, who wrote many different works both in Arabic and in French.

After attending school in her native city Nazareth and in Lebanon, May Elias Ziadeh immigrated along with her family to Egypt in 1908, and started publishing her works in French (under the pen name Isis Copia) in 1911. Gibran Kahlil Gibran entered into a correspondence with her in 1912. Being a prolific writer, she wrote for Arabic-language newspapers and periodicals, along with publishing poems and books. May Elias Ziadeh held one of the most famous literary salons in the modern Arab world in the year 1921. After suffering some personal losses at the beginning of the 1930s, she came back to Lebanon where her relatives placed her in a psychiatric hospital. However, she was able to get out of it, and then left for Cairo, where she later died.

May Elias Ziadeh was one of the key figures of the Nahda in the early 20th-century Arab literary scene and a "pioneer of Oriental feminism."

Biography

Early and personal life
May Ziadeh was the daughter of Elias Zakhur Ziadeh, a Lebanese Maronite from the Chahtoul family and Nuzha Khalil Mu'mar, a Palestinian, in Nazareth, Ottoman Palestine. Her father had been a teacher and the editor of Al Mahrūsah. 

May Elias Ziadeh attended primary school in Nazareth. As her father came to the Keserwan region of Mount Lebanon, she was sent at the age of 14 to Aintoura to pursue her secondary studies at a French convent school for girls. Her studies in Aintoura exposed her to French and Romantic literature, to which she took a particular liking. She attended several Roman Catholic schools in Lebanon before returning to Nazareth in the year 1904 to be with her parents. She is reported to have published her first articles at the age of 16. In 1908, she and her family immigrated to Egypt.

Ziadeh never married, but from 1912 onward, she maintained an extensive written correspondence with one of the literary giants of the twentieth century, the Lebanese-American poet and writer Khalil Gibran. Although the pair never met, the correspondence lasted 19 years until his death in 1931.
 

Between 1928 and 1932, Ziadeh suffered a series of personal losses, beginning with the death of her parents, a number of her friends, and above all Khalil Gibran. She fell into a deep depression and returned to Lebanon where her relatives placed her in a psychiatric hospital to gain control over her estate. Nawal El Saadawi alleges that Ziadeh was sent to the hospital for expressing feminist sentiments. Ziadeh was profoundly humiliated and incensed by this decision; she eventually recovered and left after a medical report proved that she was of sound mental health. She returned to Cairo where she died on October 17, 1941.

Journalism and language studies
Ziadeh's father founded Al Mahroussah newspaper while the family was in Egypt. She contributed to a number of articles. She also published articles in Al Hilal, Al Ahram and Al Muqtataf.

Ziadeh was particularly interested in learning languages. She studied privately at home alongside her French-Catholic education, and later at a local university for a Modern Languages degree while in Egypt. She graduated in 1917. As a result, Ziadeh was completely bilingual in Arabic and French, and had working knowledge of English, Italian, German, Syriac, Spanish, Latin as well as Modern Greek.

Key Arab literary figure
Ziadeh was well known in Arab literary circles, receiving many male and female writers and intellectuals at a literary salon she established in 1912 (and which Egyptian poet Gamila El Alaily attempted to emulate after Ziadeh's death). Among those that frequented the salon were Taha Hussein, Khalil Moutrane, Ahmed Lutfi el-Sayed, Antoun Gemayel, Walieddine Yakan, Abbas el-Akkad and Yaqub Sarruf.

Ziadeh is credited with introducing the work of Khalil Gibran to the Egyptian public.

Philosophical views

Feminism and Orientalism
Unlike her peers Princess Nazli Fazil and Huda Sha'arawi, May Ziyadah was more a 'woman of letters' than a social reformer. However, she was also involved in the women's emancipation movement. Ziadeh was deeply concerned with the emancipation of the Arab woman; a task to be effected first by tackling ignorance, and then anachronistic traditions. She considered women to be the basic elements of every human society and wrote that a woman enslaved could not breastfeed her children with her own milk when that milk smelled strongly of servitude.

She specified that female evolution towards equality need not be enacted at the expense of femininity, but rather that it was a parallel process. In 1921, she convened a conference under the heading, "Le but de la vie" ("The goal of life"), where she called upon Arab women to aspire toward freedom, and to be open to the Occident without forgetting their Oriental identity. Despite her death in 1941 her writings still represent the ideals of the first wave of Lebanese feminism. Ziadeh believed in liberating women and the first wave focused on doing just that through education, receiving voting rights, and finally having representation in government.

Romanticism
Bearing a romantic streak from childhood, Ziadeh was successively influenced by Lamartine, Byron, Shelley, and finally Gibran. These influences are evident in the majority of her works. She often reflected on her nostalgia for Lebanon and her fertile, vibrant, sensitive imagination is as evident as her mystery, melancholy and despair.

Works
Ziadeh's first published work, Fleurs de rêve (1911), was a volume of poetry, written in French, using the pen name of Isis Copia. She wrote quite extensively in French, and occasionally English or Italian, but as she matured she increasingly found her literary voice in Arabic. She published works of criticism and biography, volumes of free-verse poetry and essays, and novels. She translated several European authors into Arabic, including Arthur Conan Doyle from English, Brada (the Italian Contessa Henriette Consuelo di Puliga) from French, and Max Müller from German. She hosted the most famous literary salon of the Arab world during the twenties and thirties in Cairo.

Well noted titles of her works in Arabic (with English translation in brackets) include:

- Bâhithat el-Bâdiya باحثة البادية ("Seeker in the Desert", pen name of Malak Hifni Nasif)
- Sawâneh fatât سوانح فتاة  (Platters of Crumbs)
- Zulumât wa Ichâ'ât ظلمات وإشاعات (Humiliation and Rumors...)
- Kalimât wa Ichârât كلمات وإشارات (Words and Signs)
- Al Saha'ef الصحائف (The Newspapers)
- Ghayat Al-Hayât غاية الحياة (The Meaning of Life)
- Al-Musâwât المساواة (Equality)
- Bayna l-Jazri wa l-Madd بين الجزر والمد (Between the Ebb and Flow)

Feminist Works 
Ziadeh is considered by many as integral to the feminist movement having published many autobiographies of women between 1919-1925, this was part of her advocacy for the empowerment of women, examples of women featured in her work include Egyptian feminist Malak Hifni Nassef in her book Bahithat-ul-Badia.  She was credited as being the first women to use the term "women's cause" in the Arab world according to critic Hossam Aql, "She was the first professional writer to take a critical approach to women's stories or novels written by Arab women." . Her fiction often included strong female characters and discussed the condition of Arab women, for example in one of her short stories, she illustrates the evil of frequent divorce and remarriage which she blames on men and patriarcal society.

Awards
In 1999, May Ziadeh was named by the Lebanese Minister of Culture as the personage of the year around which the annual celebration of "Beirut, cultural capital of the Arab world" would be held.

Legacy
A Google Doodle on 11 February 2012 commemorated Ziadeh's 126th birth anniversary.

See also
Women's literary salons and societies in the Arab world

Notes

References

Bibliography

Further reading

Bloomsbury Guide to Women's Literature
Marilyn Booth, 'Biography and Feminist Rhetoric in Early Twentieth Century Egypt: Mayy Ziyada's Studies of Three Women's Lives', Journal of Women's History 3:1 (1991), pp. 38–64

Tahir Khemiri & G. Kampffmeyer, Leaders in Contemporary Arabic Literature: A Book of Reference (1930), pp. 24–27
Joseph T. Zeidan, Arabic Women Novelists: The Formative Years and Beyond. 1995.
Antje Ziegler, 'Al-Haraka Baraka! The Late Rediscovery of Mayy Ziyāda's Works', Die Welt des Islams 39:1 (1999), pp. 103–115

External links

French, English and Arabic profile of May Ziade 
May Ziade: The Life of an Arab Feminist Writer - documentary on Al Jazeera English (Video, 47 mins)

1886 births
1941 deaths
Lebanese feminists
Lebanese Maronites
Lebanese novelists
Lebanese women writers
Salon-holders from the Ottoman Empire
People from Nazareth
Translators from English
Translators from French
German–Arabic translators
Translators to Arabic
Lebanese salon-holders
Arabic-language women poets
Arabic-language poets
Arabic-language writers from the Ottoman Empire
20th-century Lebanese poets
20th-century novelists
20th-century women writers
20th-century translators
Lebanese people of Palestinian descent
Palestinian Christians
Palestinian women writers
Palestinian literature